General elections were held in Sark on 10 December 2008, the first elections on the island.

Fifty-seven candidates (12% of the eligible electors) stood for 28 seats in the Chief Pleas. The elected members in the new Chief Pleas were titled Conseillers and replaced the mixed system of elected People's Deputies and ex-officio Tenants in the outgoing Chief Pleas. The President of the Chief Pleas continued to be the Seneschal, whose term was extended from three years to for-life. The Conseillers elected in 2008 served either four or two-year terms. 14 Conseillers elected for two-year terms served until the 2010 election, held in December 2010; while the remainder served four years terms, thus achieving a rolling election cycle. The selection of which Conseillers elected in 2008 were to serve a two-year term or a four-year term was determined by random ballot.

A recount took place on 11 December due to the closeness of the votes for the 28th seat.

Background 

On 16 January and 21 February 2008, the Chief Pleas approved a law which introduces a 30-member chamber, with 28 elected members and two unelected members. On 9 April 2008 the Privy Council approved the Sark law reforms, and the new chamber convened for the first time on 21 January 2009.

Electoral system 
The first election held in Sark under the new system took place on 10 December 2008. In total, 28 Conseillers were to be elected via plurality block voting from 57 candidates, with the latter figure representing about 12% of the electorate in the island. A recount was ordered as several of the candidates for the last seat were separated by only a few votes.

Results
The elections reflected the "Sark chasm" throughout the island between those who supported the traditional system and those who supported further reforms. The overwhelming majority of candidates who were elected had either previously voted in Chief Pleas to enact the 2008 Reform Law, or had made public statements in support of it, and since advocated the further dismantling of the feudal system via the reform of the ancient feudal land tenure laws.

Results from the second count were:

After the results of the ballot were declared, a separate ballot was held among the 28 successful Conseillers to determine which would serve for two years, and which for four years, which is indicated by the figure after the number of votes. After the initial period, Conseillers will serve four-year terms with half elected every two years.

Reaction of the Barclay brothers 
When it became apparent that only about five candidates they had supported had been elected, the Barclay brothers announced that they were shutting down their businesses on Sark – hotels, shops, estate agents and building firms – leaving about 100 people, or a sixth of the population, out of work. The closures started almost immediately following the announcement. Diana Beaumont, the wife of Seigneur John Michael Beaumont, commented that "[the Barclay brothers] were the ones that started all this democracy business, now they don’t like it because they haven't won." The States of Jersey, sitting in session on 12 December 2008, resolved to send a message of support to its sister island of Sark.

In January 2009, the Barclays quietly began reversing the shutdown process.

References

External links 
 Sark Government

Sark
Elections in Sark
2008 in Guernsey
December 2008 events in Europe